Jan Ciepiela (born 21 January 1989 in Świętochłowice) is a retired Polish sprinter who specialised in the 400 metres. He represented his country at the 2009 World Championships finishing fifth in the 4 × 400 metres relay. In addition he won two medals at the 2009 European U23 Championships.

International competitions

1Disqualified in the final

Personal bests
Outdoor
200 metres – 21.45 (+0.7 m/s, Sosnowiec 2014)
400 metres – 45.81 (Kaunas 2009)
Indoor
200 metres – 21.60 (Spała 2014)
400 metres – 46.72 (Turin 2009)

References

1989 births
Living people
Polish male sprinters
People from Świętochłowice
20th-century Polish people
21st-century Polish people